Trochomorphoidea is  a taxonomic superfamily of small to large terrestrial pulmonate gastropod mollusks, that belong to the infraorder Limacoidei.

Families
 Chronidae Thiele, 1931
 Dyakiidae Gude & B. B. Woodward, 1921
 Euconulidae H. B. Baker, 1928
 Staffordiidae Thiele, 1931
 Trochomorphidae Möllendorff, 1890
Synonyms
 Ryssotidae Schileyko, 2003: synonym of Chronidae Thiele, 1931

References

 Bouchet P., Rocroi J.P., Hausdorf B., Kaim A., Kano Y., Nützel A., Parkhaev P., Schrödl M. & Strong E.E. (2017). Revised classification, nomenclator and typification of gastropod and monoplacophoran families. Malacologia. 61(1-2): 1-526.

External links

Limacoidei
Trochomorphoidea